Cleo Paskal is a Non-Resident Senior Fellow for the Indo-Pacific at the Foundation for Defense of Democracies, Senior Fellow at the Usanas Foundation, Fellow at the Conference of Defence Associations Institute, Fellow at the Canadian Global Affairs Institute, a Collaborator at the Network for Strategic Analysis, and on the International Board of Advisors of the Kalinga Institute of Indo-Pacific Studies and the Global Counter-Terrorism Council.

Paskal specializes in strategic issues in the Indo-Pacific. From 2006 to 2022, she was an Associate Fellow at Chatham House (a.k.a. Royal Institute of International Affairs), where, among other projects, she led Chatham House's project 'Geostrategic outlook for the Indo-Pacific 2019-2024'. She also led a multi-year research project based at the Centre d'études et de recherches internationales de l'Université de Montréal (CÉRIUM), where she is a visiting fellow, looking at strategic shifts in the Indo-Pacific. As part of the project, she set up The Oceania Research Project. She was a visiting fellow at Gateway House (Indian Council on Global Relations) in 2019.

Apart from contributing chapters to peer reviewed academic books Cleo Paskal has contributed to, among many others, Washington Examiner, Quillette, The Diplomat, The Economist, The World Today, Conde Nast Traveller, The Independent, The Telegraph, The Times, Chicago Tribune, Australian Financial Review, New Zealand Herald, The Farmer's Almanac,  Lonely Planet, and the Sunday Times as well as hosting BBC radio shows. She has had columns with the Canadian Broadcasting Corporation, National Post, and the Toronto Star. Having attended McGill University, she co-founded that school's satire magazine, The Red Herring. She also wrote the Primetime Emmy Award winning TV series Cirque du Soleil: Fire Within. She is the Sunday Guardian North America Special Correspondent.

References

External links 
 Chatham House page
 
 Cleo Paskal Fellowship page the Pierre Elliott Trudeau Foundation

Living people
Canadian travel writers
Canadian columnists
Canadian child actresses
Canadian voice actresses
Toronto Star people
Canadian women journalists
Manipal Academy of Higher Education alumni
HuffPost writers and columnists
Women travel writers
American women columnists
21st-century Canadian women writers
21st-century Canadian non-fiction writers
Chatham House people
Canadian women non-fiction writers
Year of birth missing (living people)
21st-century American women